This is the list of characters from The Idolmaster game franchise.

765 Production

765 idols
The primary characters in The Idolmaster are affiliated with 765 Production, described as a small, independent talent agency based in a small office.

 
 
 Million Live! archetype: Princess
 Haruka is an all-around ordinary girl and is considered the face of The Idolmaster. She has enjoyed singing and making sweets since she was a child, despite the fact that she seems to be quite inept as a cook in general. She is easily excited and a bit clumsy, admitting that she habitually trips at least once a day. However, Haruka remains positive and keeps a strong resolve, always working the hardest to make the Producer happy. Even though her character image color is red, Haruka actually tends to be a bit partial toward the color magenta, if not pink, which is Iori's image color. Haruka is best distinguished by the ribbon bows on her hair. Apart from her dream of becoming a popular idol, she's very grounded in her roots and is comfortable just having work in general, as well as spending time with her fellow idols. Haruka is close to the other idols, but she is the closest to Chihaya Kisaragi, whom she helps overcome her past.

 
 
 Million Live! archetype: Fairy
 Cool and serious, Chihaya has the greatest enthusiasm towards music and the greatest natural talent of all of the girls, earnestly believing that if she were no longer able to sing, she would rather die. She does not very much care for the title "idol" though, preferring to refer to herself as a "vocalist" instead. Chihaya enjoys listening to classical music, and spending time by herself, giving an aura of maturity about her, though she is really just awkward when it comes to communicating with other people. Despite her age, she has the smallest bust out of all of the characters, which makes her become envious at times when she sees other girls with a bigger bust, especially Takane and Azusa, such as during the beach trip. Chihaya has a tragic past, namely that she lost her younger brother to a car accident eight years ago, causing her to blame herself for what had happened. This also led to her parents' divorce, driving a wedge between her and her parents. She overcomes her past thanks to her friends, and after that, she is more expressive and cheerful. Chihaya is Haruka Amami's best friend.

 
 
 Million Live! archetype: Princess
 A terrible crybaby, Yukiho aspires to become an idol in order to one day shed her cowardly disposition. She is afraid of dogs – even chihuahuas seem threatening to her – and does not do well with men either. Having grown up in a strict, traditional Japanese household, Yukiho's drink of choice is tea, preferably green tea. Among her hobbies is poetry, especially writing haikus, but she is too shy to share her poems with anyone even once. Though her image color is white, she tends to be partial to the color "Baby Blue". Whenever she is depressed or scared, she has a habit of running off, exclaiming she will go "dig a hole and bury myself in it." Sometimes, she takes it literally, grabbing a shovel and digging a hole until someone tells her to stop. Yukiho is Makoto Kikuchi's best friend since childhood.
 In 2010, Yukiho's voice actress, Yurika Ochiai (now known as Yurina Hase), resigned from her role, citing death threats against her that also forced her to change her name. As a result, she was replaced by Azumi Asakura from The Idolmaster 2 onwards.

 
 
 Million Live! archetype: Angel
 Yayoi is a bright and optimistic girl who cares for her family very much. Due to her father's unstable occupational status, her family is quite poor, as indicated by Yayoi's plain clothing, which she has actually had for a very long time. To earn extra money, Yayoi often does cleaning and other odd jobs around the 765 Production office building, and continues to do so even after she debuts as an idol. Fittingly, she is highly energetic, never letting the weight of the world discourage her. Yayoi is the oldest of six siblings and is often the one who looks after her siblings, but also wishes that she had an "older brother" type around to look after her. Yayoi is very close to Iori Minase, despite having vastly different backgrounds.

 
 
 Million Live! archetype: Fairy
 The cool, smart-girl type, Ritsuko believes in theory more than her own inner strength. Originally an intern working at 765 Production after graduating from high school, due to a lack of girls scouted by 765 Production, Ritsuko decided to become an idol herself. Ritsuko's family consists of herself, her mother, and her father. Her parents share the same trait as Ritsuko – being business-like and hardworking. They also own a shop in the city. Despite being an idol, she still has one hand in the business side of her own celebrity life, and is quick to chide the Producer if she thinks he is not doing his job correctly.
 In The Idolmaster 2, Ritsuko becomes the producer for the idol group Ryūgū Komachi and ties her hair up. She'll tie her hair in braids again when using a Ryūgū Komachi costume in the game. In the anime, she is a semi-active idol who became a producer for 765 Production, and ties her hair in braids for the concert in episode 18.
 As of Platinum Stars, Ritsuko is now a semi-active idol in 765 Production.

 
 
 Million Live! archetype: Angel
 The oldest amongst all idols in the game, Azusa's personality reflects that of a kind-hearted but air-headed "big sister" type. She has a very easy-going and carefree personality, but also an incredibly terrible sense of direction, which becomes subject of a running gag – whenever she is walking, she will end up in a strange, distant place, with no idea of how she got there or how to get back. Her air-headed personality is shown when she thought of Hibiki's hamster as 'a valuable thing', making her attempt to put him inside a safe to safeguard him during the beach trip. Azusa also enjoys giving and reading fortunes, and has a firm belief that she will one day fall in love with "someone destined for her". One of her motivations for becoming an idol is, in fact, to someday find her true love.
 In The Idolmaster 2, Azusa cuts her hair short (which was originally long) and makes an idol group with Iori and Ami called Ryūgū Komachi. In the anime, Azusa still has long hair at the beginning, but later cuts her hair short after she joins Ryūgū Komachi.

 
 
 Million Live! archetype: Fairy
 The daughter of one of the associates of the 765 Production president, Iori is a spoiled rich girl who flaunts her family's wealth. Although she is quite polite and refined on stage and in public, she has a very sharp tongue and is quick to berate other people's intelligence or attitude, especially the Producer. Probably because of being raised with two older brothers, Iori has grown up with a strong competitive streak, and thus rarely shows any weaknesses. However, she does have a much softer side that she shows from time to time, making her personality that of an archetypal tsundere character. She is sometimes seen carrying around a stuffed rabbit with her, which she named "Usa-chan" (also known as "Charles Donatello the 18th" in the anime). Though very rich and spoiled, her best friend is Yayoi Takatsuki, who happens to be much poorer than her.
 In The Idolmaster 2, Iori makes an idol group with Ami and Azusa called Ryūgū Komachi. She also changes her hairstyle, leaving a bang of hair out of her hairband.

 
 
 Million Live! archetype: Princess
 A tomboyish girl, Makoto is popularized as the "pretty-boy idol" within 765 Production. As a result, she has accumulated more female fans than male ones, becoming the cause of her psychological complex and a running gag at her expense in the plot. She is usually seen in sporty outfits and was already very popular among her fellow students at the all-girls school she attends, and her current work as an idol does not make the situation any easier for her. Her father is a famous race-car driver and had wished for a son instead, so he raised Makoto as a boy. Even though she is not ungrateful of her popularity, underneath her gruff, boyish exterior, Makoto is actually an honest, sensitive girl who wishes to make herself more feminine. Therefore, unbeknownst to her father, she decided to become an idol in order to find a way to a new, more feminine presence for herself and to show others that she can have a girly side as well. She is also shown to be friends with Yukiho Hagiwara, who is much different from her as far as personality is concerned.
 As of The Idolmaster 2, Makoto grows her hair longer and parts her bangs in the middle, and she is also revealed to be a skilled mixed martial artist.

 
 
 Million Live! archetype: Angel
 Ami and Mami are a pair of playful identical twin sisters who make a two-girl singing sensation. Ami and Mami both enjoy doing impressions and teasing their co-workers, though Ami is said to be more fun-loving than Mami. The only way to tell the two girls apart is through their hairstyles – Ami ties her hair to the right, Mami to the left – otherwise, they are identical. They use this to their advantage by switching their hairstyles and both performing as idols, but only underneath Ami's name. In The Idolmaster arcade game, the only people who actually know that Ami and Mami are twins are fellow members of 765 Production.
 By the time of The Idolmaster 2, the public has come to acknowledge the existence of the twins. As a result, Ami makes an idol group with Iori and Azusa called Ryūgū Komachi. In the anime, the twins are already produced as separate idols.

 
 
 Million Live! archetype: Angel
 The other half of the Futami twins, Mami is available to produce as a solo idol from The Idolmaster 2 onwards. As the twin sister of Ami, Mami has many similarities to Ami in terms of personality, but is described as more mature and a little more obedient in comparison.
 While the original arcade game implies that Ami is the older of the twins, the Xbox 360 game hints towards Mami being the older twin, which seems to have been the case since then. Also in The Idolmaster 2, Mami extends her ponytail longer to further differentiate herself from her sister, and she often worries that she doesn't get as much work as Ami due to the time they spent as the same idol.

Project Fairy
Project Fairy is an idol unit introduced in The Idolmaster SP, produced by the rival 961 Production. The group was specifically created so that its three members harmonize perfectly with each other, and have different specialties. As of The Idolmaster Dearly Stars, the members of Project Fairy have become part of 765 Production.

 
 
 Million Live! archetype: Angel
 Introduced in the Xbox 360 port of the original arcade game, Miki is a naturally talented girl who feels that she has rarely had to work hard for anything. Because of this, she is pretty lazy and always approaches tasks with a very laid-back attitude. She manages good grades with minimal effort and boasts natural good-looks that belie her age, but she can sometimes become an annoyance to others because of her rare attitude she has sometimes. She even receives about 20 confessions of love per day from boys. Raised in a very laissez-faire family, Miki's parents don't see any problem with her becoming an idol. While she doesn't really have cruel intentions, she believes like everything else, she can make her way to become a top idol easily. Miki is also known to love onigiri, and can be seen sleeping all day when not doing anything else. Her catchphrase is "Afuu", which she utters every time she finishes yawning.
 In the Xbox 360 game, Miki is in some way the main character besides Haruka, and her character has developed considerably over the game's year-long time span. If special conditions are met in the game, she cuts her hair short and no longer dyes it blonde.
 In The Idolmaster SP, Miki was unsatisfied with the way she was being managed, and switched to rival production company, 961 Production, as a member of the group "Project Fairy".
 As of The Idolmaster Dearly Stars, Miki has rejoined 765 Pro. Her hair also received minor changes in The Idolmaster 2, now being naturally blonde and slightly wavier.

 
 
 Million Live! archetype: Princess
 Introduced in The Idolmaster SP as a member of "Project Fairy", Hibiki is a highly energetic and cheerful girl hailing from Okinawa. Despite rivalries with the other idols, she remains friendly and happy, without becoming overly competitive like Takane. Hibiki has an outstanding number of pets, which she happens to lose quite frequently – her pets include a mouse, a hamster (named Hamuzō in the anime), a gerbil, a parrot, a rabbit, a cat, a dog (a female St. Bernard named Inumi in the anime), a pig, a flying squirrel and, oddly enough, a crocodile. She also has a pet chicken (named Kokemaro), but apparently it is kept at her parents' home in Okinawa.
 As of The Idolmaster Dearly Stars, Hibiki has become part of 765 Pro. Her three sizes also shrank, since she is the only character that happens to, leading some fans to theorize that President Kuroi had lied about her measurements.

 
 
 Million Live! archetype: Fairy
 Introduced in The Idolmaster SP as a member of "Project Fairy", Takane is an elegant young woman from an affluent background, as seen in her outfits. While she has an elegant, snobbish attitude due to her wealthy upbringing, she also has a refined, regal personality, and a princess-like air to her. She hardly ever sees her mother, and her father often goes out on business trips – he is said to own a large company, much like Iori's father, which is also why Takane has problems with her father – so she lives with her butler. Takane has an amazing passion for music. She is considered one of the smarter characters in the series, and is fluent in numerous languages, including German. She also often observes far more detailed things than almost everybody else. Furthermore, it is implied in the anime that she was not born in Japan. She is indeed mysterious in almost every way imaginable as she keeps most of her personal information hidden, especially where she came from. Despite being from a very wealthy family, Takane secretly takes an interest in commoner lifestyle and really enjoys ramen.
 As of The Idolmaster Dearly Stars, Takane has signed up to 765 Pro.

765 staff
 
 
 The protagonist of The Idolmaster. He is a young rookie producer who has been put in charge of a new set of pop idols. In the game, his name is never given, and is decided by the player. His personality is also dependent on the player's choices, and can range from sweet and protective to lewd and perverted. However, in the drama CDs, he's most usually portrayed as somewhere in between.
 In the anime, the producer remains unnamed, but is given the physical appearance of a young man with dark blue hair, glasses and a business suit. As the girls' producer, he is a very hard working individual who tries his best to help the idols as their mentor figure, going to whatever lengths to make sure the girls are happy, healthy, and able to make their appearances. Like Yukiho, he too is afraid of dogs. While he mainly produces the rest of the girls, he sometimes co-produces Ryūgū Komachi with Ritsuko, often taking over when she is unavailable or it only involves a single member, even temporarily producing Ritsuko when she goes back on stage for a concert. He is most often Yukiho's manager throughout the time.

 
 
 The president of 765 Production, he takes the Producer under his wing and monitors his performance in charge of the girls. He is never seen as anything but a silhouette, and is rarely encountered outside of the 765 Pro office building, except at the final performance in The Idolmaster game. In The Idolmaster Break! manga, his appearance is revealed to be a middle-aged man around his fifties or sixties.
 Before The Idolmaster 2 entered development, Jun'ichirō's voice actor, Kan Tokumaru, passed away. As a result, in The Idolmaster 2, Jun'ichirō is given a story of why he did not return in the game – he has handed over the position of president of 765 Production to his cousin, Junjirō Takagi, so he can stop having to travel around Japan as he plans to move to Hawaii. Since then, Jun'ichirō is the chairman of 765 Production.

 
 
 Jun'ichirō's cousin and the president of 765 Production as of The Idolmaster 2. Much like his cousin, he appears only as a silhouette in the game. However, he does physically appear in the anime, although his face is still not fully shown. He puts a lot of faith and trust in his idols, believing that they will eventually make it through. Because of this, he desires to promote them simply as themselves and have them rely on their own talents to pull them through. Furthermore, he uses his resources well to keep his idols happy as he believes that they are at their best when they are happy.

 
 
 An office clerk at 765 Production. Kotori originally only appears at the end of The Idolmaster arcade game, but then becomes a recurring character within the drama CDs. Originally featured on The Idolmaster arcade game webpage in the F.A.Q. section, she has accumulated enough fans to appear later on The Idolmaster media franchise. Among the few things disclosed about her personality and character, Kotori is known to be a little older than Azusa (making her somewhere in her early twenties), and despite not being an idol herself, she does love to sing. Her surname literally means "soundless", which refers to the fact that she was originally unvoiced. Kotori has a mole beauty mark on her right cheek that is often covered up by her microphone piece.
 In The Idolmaster 2, Kotori remains a clerk at 765 Production. Kotori's mole also appears as a DLC accessory.
 In The Idolmaster anime, Kotori takes a more active role with the girls, especially when the Producer and Ritsuko are busy. A young girl, implied to be a younger Kotori (albeit with longer hair and a mole under her right eye; later confirmed to be Kotori's mother, Kotomi), was revealed to have been produced by Junjirō and Kuroi before they went their separate ways.
 Kotori is the protagonist of the manga Asayake wa Koganeiro, which depicts her in her high school days, during which she aims to become an idol.

 
 
 A 765 Pro secretary introduced in Theater Days, usually taking the place of Kotori Otonashi in the game. Her birthday is the same as the release date of Theater Days.

Spin-off staff
These 765 Pro staff members only appear in spin-off media.

 
 
 Jun'ichirō's grandson, Yūtarō is the protagonist of The Idolmaster Break! manga. He is a fan of the idols of 765 Production, especially Haruka. But when his grandfather gets sick, Yūtarō is forced to temporarily take over the company as both its new president and its producer as he deals with the company's finances and manages the idols' careers.

 
 Chihaya's producer who appears in the first volume of the novel. A returnee from the United States, where he had an unsuccessful music career, he took the job after returning to Japan.

 
 Ritsuko, Haruka and Yukiho's producer in the second volume of the novel. She is a former acquaintance of President Takagi.

 
 
 A bijin who assists the Producer in "DRAMA CD NEW STAGE 01".

Puchimas!
Puchimas! Petit Idolmaster is a spin-off manga and anime series where the 765 Pro characters are accompanied by chibi versions of themselves ("Puchidols"), each of whom shares the same voice actress.

  
 Haruka's Puchidol. Similar to Gremlins, she dislikes sunlight, turns malicious when her hair ribbons are misplaced, multiplies herself whenever she comes into contact with water, creating a huge number of clones much to the others' chagrin, and becomes demonic when fed after midnight. She also likes to nibble at others.
  
 Chihaya's Puchidol who loves to sing, but dislikes girls with large breasts, reflecting Chihaya's self-counsciousness with her own bust size, with Ritsuko as the only exception. She also develops a longer hair during winter that grows back soon after it is cut.
  
 Yukiho's Puchidol who loves tea and usually rests in a cardboard box or in a hole she drilled for herself, which is often her preferred hiding place in any situation. In the winter, she grows a tanuki tail.
  
 Yayoi's Puchidol who reacts sharply to the sound of money falling and other kind of sounds. When it gets cold, she grows tufty, lame-looking long hair.
  
 Ritsuko's Puchidol who's very good at office work and loves to be petted and complimented by the producer. Also similar to Ritsuko, she takes care of the other puchis.
  
 Azusa's Puchidol who has teleporting powers, warping to a random location when startled by a loud noise, and usually helps the other idols and puchis when they need fast transportation.
  
 Iori's Puchidol who can charge energy on her forehead to unleash a beam of destruction, which is often used against roaches.
  
 Makoto's Puchidol who is very cute and strong, capable of dealing strong pro-wrestling moves, as well as having healing powers. She is often seen as fat due to Makoto, who often overfed her out of her cuteness.
  and 
 Ami and Mami's Puchidols who love to play pranks and usually get themselves in trouble. Unlike the others, who stay with their counterparts, Koami and Komami stay with Takane while Takane's Puchidol, Takanya, stays with Ami and Mami.
  
 Miki's Puchidol who, much like her counterpart, loves onigiri. When she is exposed to heat, her hair color and personality changes dramatically.
  
 Hibiki's Puchidol who is very energetic and can summon strange animals to do her bidding, a power that tends to go haywire whenever she cries, bringing forth dangerous monsters.
  
 Takane's Puchidol. Found in a Brazil-like tropical country, she loves ramen, has an unusual personality and talks by writing out words on paper. Unlike the others, who stay with their counterparts, Takane does not take a liking to Takanya, but obsesses over the others, especially Koami and Komami, of whom she does take care.
  
 Kotori's Puchidol who is more reliable in office work than her, and is also very agile and capable of flying.
 Producer (Puchimas version) 
   
 A human with a huge letter "P" in the place of his head.

Million Live!
The Idolmaster Million Live! introduces thirty-nine idols who, alongside the thirteen original 765 idols, are all categorized into two different archetype categories: one involving specialty (Vocal, Dance, Visual; used in the Million Live! mobile game) and another involving personality (Princess, Fairy, and Angel; used in Theater Days).

Princess
 
 
 Specialty type: Vocal
 Mirai is a high-spirited girl who decided to become an idol when a friend of hers took her to a concert. She is not the smartest girl around though, as she often forgets to do her homework and knows nothing about historical figures.
 
 
 Specialty type: Vocal
 Kotoha is a workaholic young woman with a passion for acting. Despite being described as diligent and determined to do her best, she has one fatal weakness – she has a fragile mentality. This causes her to have very low confidence and easily get stressed by her routine. She is best friends with Megumi Tokoro and Elena Shimabara.
 Kotoha was originally absent at the launch of Theater Days because her voice actress, Risa Taneda, took a hiatus from voice acting due to illness. She was eventually added to the game on February 2018.
 
 
 Specialty type: Dance
 Minako is the daughter of a Chinese restaurant owner, where she also worked as a waitress and, on some occasions, a chef. Unsurprisingly, she is very good at cooking. She can cook dishes in large quantities, firmly believing the more food one takes, the happier one becomes. Minako's hobbies include fighting video games.
 
 
 Specialty type: Visual
 Matsuri is a young woman with a colorful personality who habitually fancies herself as some sort of princess. While she can be oblivious to her surroundings whenever she is acting like a princess, Matsuri is actually a mature and wise young woman, aware that her princess persona is just an act after all. She cares a lot for her fellow idols, especially the younger ones. It is also said that she is very good at everything she does, despite claiming she has no idea about that.
 
 
 Specialty type: Visual
 Yuriko is a young girl who loves to read books, especially fantasy and mystery novels, causing her to develop a habit of fantasizing about the story from the books happening around her. In reality, she is incredibly shy and tends to step aside from strangers. In fact, her only friend before she became an idol was Anna Mochizuki, with whom she plays in an MMOPRG, where Yuriko goes by the name of 'LilyKnight'.
 
 
 Specialty type: Vocal
 An honor student at her class and a talented vocalist, Sayoko is a serious and hot-blooded girl who's so determined to do anything she has to do that she never backs down until the last moment. She became an idol because she had promised with someone referred to only as "that child" during a summer festival. Whenever she is performing as an idol, Sayoko would always ditch her glasses beforehand, but this causes her to be unable to see clearly.
 
 
 Specialty type: Vocal
 An enthusiastic idol otaku to the point of obsession, Arisa is such a big fan of idols that she has collected every idol merchandise she can find. She also owns an exhaustive database storing information about idols, especially those from 765 Pro, in her computer. Wishing to get closer to the idols she admires, Arisa decided to take an audition and become an idol herself.
 
 
 Specialty type: Dance
 Umi is an athletic and energetic girl who can't stand staying inactive for a long time. Said to be capable of doing almost every kind of sport, Umi believes that she is blessed with having good legs. When she was younger, she took ballet lessons, which is why her body is very flexible. While highly athletic and enjoying sports, she doesn't mind having to wear girly idol costumes.
 
 
 Specialty type: Visual
 The youngest of the cast of Million Live!, Iku is quite a precocious young girl for her age of 10. She believes she can do anything on her own and hates being treated like a child, though she is still a child anyway. Iku is best friends with Momoko Suō.
 
 
 Specialty type: Dance
 An energetic and cheerful European girl – confirmed to be from the United Kingdom, probably England – Emily came to Japan because she is passionate about its culture, claiming one day she will become a yamato nadeshiko. She speaks Japanese in a very peculiar way, using archaic phrases and complicated Japanese terms that were more common in the older eras. It is revealed that Emily learned Japanese from her dance teacher.
 
 
 Specialty type: Vocal
 Kana is a cheerful girl who loves to sing and aspires to be an idol. However, she is tone-deaf, and is thus a terrible singer. Because of this, she has been working as hard as she can to improve her singing. Her singing aside, Kana is shown to be really good at playing the clarinet.
 
 
 Specialty type: Dance
 A cheerful girl from Osaka, Nao can be described as some kind of a stereotypical Osakan, as evident with her distinct Kansai dialect and her love for sweets. She is also forgetful, often forgetting what she just said a few minutes before. While she is known to have a great belief in herself, Nao can be stubborn too, preferring to take action first without a forethought.
 
 
 Specialty type: Dance
 A big fan of mixed martial arts and pro wrestling, Noriko is an active and outgoing girl. Despite being such a tomboy, she wishes to be girlier and aims to create a cute image around her as an idol. She's not used to girly things though, so she decided to keep her tomboyish image anyway.

Fairy
 
 
 Specialty type: Vocal
 Shizuka is a stoic girl who's incredibly harsh towards the Producer due to her distrust of adults, which probably resulted from her troubled relationship with her father. She takes her idol career seriously, and believes she doesn't need help from adults at all. In reality, she is still childish and really cares for anyone she trusts or is friends with.
 
 
 Specialty type: Visual
 Megumi is a stylish girl who's really good a making friends. While she looks like a typical schoolgirl, she has a superior sense of style and is incredibly outgoing, often asking her friends out for a meal at a restaurant. The only known relative of Megumi so far is an older brother. Megumi is often seen with Kotoha Tanaka and Elena Shimabara.
  / 
 
 Specialty type: Visual
 An aspiring artist, Roco can be described as a mad genius with wild artistic antics and incomprehensible quirks. She has quite a habit of slipping English words in her speech, though she is not that good at speaking English. She even believes she was born to be an idol, the exact reason why she became one herself. Despite having such confidence in her artistic skills, Roco is in fact somewhat of a loner and turns gleeful whenever someone comes to appreciate her works of art, which is a somewhat rare occurrence in itself.
 
 
 Specialty type: Vocal
 Tomoka is a kind and polite girl who believes she is some kind of "Holy Mother". Despite looking like a refined young lady, and believing she loves all people, she also demands that people love her back. She even has quite a habit of calling her fans "piglets" and often forgets that she is being rude in her speech. It is known that Tomoka has a fanclub dedicated to her called the "Sky Knights".
 
 
 Specialty type: Visual
 Shiho is a cool, lone wolf girl who takes anything she does seriously. Her cold and stoic demeanor comes from the lack of a fatherly presence since early childhood, causing her to be the one who helps out her mother and looks after her younger brother. Struggling to make all ends meet, she decided to become an idol. Despire being so cynical and harsh, Shiho has a softer side and wishes she had a father figure in her life.
 
 
 Specialty type: Dance
 A recent returnee from the United States, Ayumu is a young woman who's really good at dancing, and nothing else. In fact, she has a fear of heights, cannot control herself when doing a sexy pose, and cannot swim at all – whenever she is close to a pool of water, chances are she will drop into the pool and scream for help. Owing to her background, Ayumu has a habit of exclaiming "Oh my God!" when she's surprised, but she otherwise cannot speak English, and she doesn't want to talk about her time in America.
 
 
 Specialty type: Visual
 A self-proclaimed celebrity, Chizuru has a habit of acting like a celebrity, though in reality, she's not very good at it. For example, she habitually ends up coughing whenever she tries to laugh. Only the more innocent girls like Yayoi and Hinata actually believe she is a celebrity herself. Despite this, Chizuru is actually generous and kind to her fellow idols, especially the younger ones.
 
 
 Specialty type: Dance
 Mizuki is a stern girl who rarely shows emotions. Despite this, she is a good person at heart and wishes to be able to express her own emotions. She also has a weird sense of humor, which in turn becomes a running gag where she appears deadpan. Mizuki likes to perform magic tricks, especially ones involving anything like poker cards and batons, enjoys crossword puzzles, and can perform baton swirling.
 
 
 Specialty type: Dance
 A flirtatious young woman, Rio is aware of her sexy body, but never has luck with men as all her attempts to woo them don't end well for her. She admits that she is never popular with boys and doesn't know why, though it is probably because she has no idea herself of how she is supposed to make use of her sexy image. It is revealed that Rio did not have the sexy body figure that she now has when she was younger. Rio is best friends with Konomi Baba.
 
 
 Specialty type: Dance
 Subaru is a hot-blooded tomboy who obsesses over baseball, to the point of incorporating baseball terminology into her speech. She is energetic and outgoing too, though sometimes she can turn nervous and head out. Her tomboyish attitude stems from being raised with four older brothers who have to look after her as they all hardly ever see their parents, who are often out on their business.
 
 
 Specialty type: Visual
 An 11-year-old former child star, Momoko probably has more experience in the entertainment industry than many of her fellow idols. She is also a bit paranoid of others, preferring to stay away from others. According to her backstory, Momoko very likely had an unhappy life. Because of her activities, she almost never had time to play with kids of her age, much less make new friends. She doesn't have a happy family either – her parents frequently get into squabbles all the time. But ever since she became an idol, her life seems to have turned for the better, and she even has got a friend in Iku Nakatani.
 
 
 Specialty type: Vocal
 Julia is a young girl who aspires to become a punk rocker. She loves singing and hates doing things half-heartedly, though she tends to be flustered whenever she is dressed in such a girly idol costume. According to her backstory, Julia accidentally signed up to 765 Production, thinking it is a talent agency for rock musicians. However, she immediately asked the Producer to keep her contract anyway just as he was about to cancel it.
 Julia is not even her real name, and for some reason, she is reluctant to reveal her real name to anyone.
 
 
 Introduced in Theater Days, Tsumugi is a refined girl who speaks politely, but tends to be a little quick. She is serious and sharp-tongued, and often has bad presumptions about anything. She specializes in kimono dress and has enthusiasm in traditional Japanese things. She was scouted when the producer went to her parents' kimono shop to return clothing.
 She debuts in the Blooming Clover manga in chapter 7.

Angel
 
 
 Specialty type: Visual
 Tsubasa is an easygoing girl who has a big interest in fashion, always going after the latest trends she can get. She also happens to be a big fan of Miki Hoshii, even to the point of becoming an idol herself. Despite her obsession with fashion, Tsubasa is still pretty naive and has an innocent perception of the world at first, especially when it comes to love and work.
 
 
 Specialty type: Dance
 Born in Brazil, Elena is an energetic young girl who wants to make people around her happy. Despite having stayed in Brazil for only six years, she is very fascinated by the carnivals and football. It is known that her mother is Brazilian, while her father is Japanese. Elena likes to hang out with Kotoha Tanaka and Megumi Tokoro.
 
 
 Specialty type: Vocal
 Serika is a friendly, good-natured young girl who lived a sheltered life before becoming an idol. Because of this, she doesn't get to know many ordinary things, for example what a family restaurant is. Her parents are in fact very protective, and her father even worries about her idol activities, though he does love to see how she is having much fun singing. It is known that Serika has a Border Collie named Junior, and can play violin.
 
 
 Specialty type: Dance
 Akane is a loud and erratic girl who fawns over her own cuteness. While she refers to herself as the "cutest girl on the planet", in reality she is always desperate to make people happy, as they tend to find her annoying. More often than not, Akane incorporates cats into her persona, even going so far as to get dressed in cat ears and make a cat paw pose, not to mention slip "nya" into her speech. It is known that Akane has a doll featuring her likeness and really loves pudding.
 
 
 Specialty type: Vocal
 A shy and quiet gamer, Anna always looks like she is tired whenever she is not doing anything else. Her only interests are video games and singing. But whenever she performs on stage, she becomes inexplicably energetic and lively. Her best friend is Yuriko Nanao, with whom she plays in an MMORPG, where Anna goes by the name of 'Vivid_Rabbit'.
 
 
 Specialty type: Vocal
 Born to a family of farmers in Hokkaido, Hinata is a gentle and innocent young girl who's honest to a fault to the point of being gullible enough to believe in others' lies. Coming from a rural region, she is uncomfortable with life in such a big city as Tokyo and, as implied in her profile, she has no knowledge about the entertainment industry in general, and the idea of being an idol in particular. Also owing to her background, Hinata speaks in an audible Hokkaido dialect and likes gardening.
 
 
 Specialty type: Dance
 Despite being the oldest of the cast of Million Live! – she is 24 years old – Konomi has a short stature for her age, and thus has a big complex about it. Because of this, she is always trying to get others to treat her like an adult instead of a kid. Even then, she is somewhat easygoing and very reliable to others. According to her backstory, Konomi originally applied for a job at 765 Production as an office lady, but her application was misplaced. As a result, she ended up being offered a job as an idol for 765 Pro instead.
 
 
 Specialty type: Dance
 A cheerful and curious extrovert, Tamaki has a great passion for nature, suggesting she comes from the countryside. Having spent most of her time climbing trees, playing with animals, and swimming in the river, she is used to the outdoors and also has a hobby of capturing insects for collection. However, during her childhood, Tamaki rarely met kids of her age, causing her to feel lonely very quickly. She then decided to become an idol because she heard that she could make friends that way. Despite her rustic appearance, Tamaki also enjoys sentai and often mimics sentai poses.
 
 
 Specialty type: Visual
 A former hospital nurse, Fūka is a gentle and caring young woman who can't refuse to do someone a favor, even if at her own expense. The bustiest of the cast of Million Live!, she has a complex about her large breasts and is easily embarrassed every time she is asked to do something people would think of as sexy.
 
 
 Specialty type: Visual
 Miya is an easygoing, but also airheaded girl who does anything she does with a my-pace approach, though she can be mischievous too. Believing that dreaming big is a good thing to do, she turned to the life of an idol so she can bring happiness to people as long as she can keep a smile. Her airheadedness aside, Miya can play shōgi and gō, having played them with the elders at a board game club, and she can make sandwiches, which is also her favorite food.
 When first announced, Miya's initial idol profile picture had different hair and eye colors from all other profile pictures of hers. Once the Million Live! game was released, this was fixed to make all colorings consistent.
 
 
 Specialty type: Visual
 A shy and reserved girl, Karen always refers to herself as someone with nothing that stands out. She is also insecure about herself, and is often afraid of other people. This, in turn, motivated her to become an idol, so as to change herself for the better. Ever since then, Karen has been trying to not let her cowardice get in the way of her new life as an idol.
 
 
 Specialty type: Dance
 Reika is a kind-hearted young woman who can be unpredictable at times. She often confuses insults for compliments, imagines weird ideas of giving surprises for others, and so on. She also often thinks of a deer as some kind of a bird. Overall, Reika's personality can be described as carefree and childish. It is known that Reika's mother was an opera singer.
 
 
 Introduced in Theater Days, Kaori is an elegant and mature former music schoolteacher.

876 Production
The talent agency introduced in and, so far, only prominently appearing in The Idolmaster Dearly Stars.

876 idols
Three new idols introduced in The Idolmaster Dearly Stars, all of whom are/were affiliated with 876 Production. They also made cameo appearances in other games and a handful of episodes in the anime. Each of them also received a three-volume manga devoted to individual story lines in the game.

 
 
 Referred to by fans as the "younger clone" of Haruka, Ai is described as an unstoppable mini-tank who never loses heart despite her shortcomings and lack of experience. She is known to have a massive amount of energy, which unfortunately tends to work against her in auditions as her energy would end up overwhelming the judges. Her mother, Mai, was in fact one of the most well-known idols in Japan before she became pregnant with Ai when she was only 15 years old. As a result, 876 Pro took interest in promoting her as Mai's daughter, but Ai insists on becoming a popular idol on her own. This becomes a problem when Mai suddenly returns to the stage as Ai now has to contend with being compared to her own mother. She decides to face her head-on, using her mother's own song, ALIVE, and defeat her with it. Afterwards, she continues on her own as an idol independent of her mother's celebrity status.
 In the PlayStation 3 version of The Idolmaster 2, Ai appears as a DLC character in Catalog 3 as a S4U character. Once she is unlocked in S4U, players can have her perform with either of the songs "ALIVE" or "Go My Way".

 
 
 A former hikikomori and internet celebrity known online as "Ellie", Eri was scouted to become an idol in real life. While she can perform well online, in real life, she is very shy, and is uncomfortable talking to loud people, such as Ai. She is also known to like cats. Owing to her background revolving around the internet, she's also really prone to spouting out internet memes. As Eri begins to grow more as a live idol, she becomes more interested in how other idols are able to stand out. But when Eri encounters a series of strange incidents, the truth about her producer, Reiko Ozaki, comes out as she also reveals her troubled time as an idol, when she had to deal with the gossips revolving around her on the net. In response, Eri decides to trust in her producer as she adapts Ozaki's unfinished song Precog and continues her career as a live idol.
 In the PlayStation 3 version of The Idolmaster 2, Eri appears as a DLC character in Catalog 5 as a S4U character. Once she is unlocked in S4U, players can have her perform with either of the songs "Precog" or "Shiny Smile".

 
 
 Ritsuko's younger cousin who's very soft-spoken compared to her, Ryō is actually a boy who poses as a female idol, keeping that a secret from his co-workers at 876 Pro. Because of his feminine appearance, he was often mistaken for a girl, and so he wanted to become a male idol, but when he went to see Ritsuko about it, she took him to 876 Pro to become one. There, he ended up covering for a female idol, much to his chagrin. He did so well and, as a result, the studio hired him as a female idol. After a series of pranks done by rival idol Yumeko Sakurai, he successfully befriends her and becomes more motivated by her dreams, allowing him to refocus on becoming a popular male idol, the very dream he always had in the first place. Starting with Sōichi Takeda writing "Dazzling World" for him to compete with Chihaya, Ryō begins to pick up momentum to finally convince the staff to let him start his career over as a male idol. He finally gets to appear on Takeda's "Old Whistle" show. By the end of the story, he comes to be accepted by his fans and becomes more popular than ever as he continues on his dream. That he switches between glasses and contact lenses, depending on whether he is doing his idol work, becomes important in distinguishing between his male and female personas.
 In the PlayStation 3 version of The Idolmaster 2, Ryo appears as a DLC character in Catalog 7 as a S4U character. Once he is unlocked in S4U, players can have him perform with either of the songs "Dazzling World" or "Kiramekirari".
 Ryō later returns in The Idolmaster SideM, where he now performs as a proper male idol as he moves to 315 Production, as part of the F-LAGS idol unit. This makes him the only Dearly Stars main character to make another major appearance.

876 staff
 
 
 Ishikawa is the president of 876 Production. She is never seen as anything but a silhouette, but appears much more often than her 765 Pro counterpart, Jun'ichirō Takagi. She is said to be very good friends with both President Takagi and Yukio Igarashi. While she does believe in her idols like Takagi does, Ishikawa is not hesitant to use tricks to make her idols popular like Mai's celebrity for Ai and Ryō's charm as a girl for him.

 
 Manami acts as manager to both Ai and Ryō, though she focuses more on Ai due to her lack of confidence. Because of this, the two form a close bond. Manami has a gentle, hardworking, and kind personality, although she can be rather ditzy sometimes.

961 Production
A talent agency introduced in The Idolmaster SP as the rival to 765 Production. As confirmed in the anime, 961 Pro is a much more established talent agency compared to 765 Pro.

961 idols
 
 
 Introduced in The Idolmaster One For All, Leon is a powerful idol who trains all day and is always running off to auditions. Other than that, not very much is known about her.
 In The Idolmaster Starlit Season, Leon forms a new unit with fellow 961 Pro idols Shika and Aya.

 
 
 Introduced in The Idolmaster Stella Stage, Shika is a new idol for 961 Pro with some kind of family relationship to the president of 961 Pro. Born and raised in Austria, she has come to Japan only recently. Because of this, Shika makes a liberal use of German phrases in her speech, and is unfamiliar with Japanese culture and customs.
 In The Idolmaster Starlit Season, Shika forms a new unit with fellow 961 Pro idols Leon and Aya.

 
 
 Introduced in The Idolmaster Starlit Season, Aya is a new idol for 961 Pro, and a member of 961 Pro's new idol unit Diamant. Fiercely competitive, she is very determined to become better than Leon and Shika.

961 staff
 
 
 The president of 961 Production, as well as Project Fairy and Jupiter's producer before their departure. Like most other producers, he's not seen, but as with the heads of other talent agencies, he appears as a silhouette. After his original idols, Project Fairy, joined the rival 765 Pro in The Idolmaster 2, he formed a new idol group called Jupiter, composed of male idols. As of One For All, Jupiter had left 961 Pro, and as a result, Kuroi hired a new idol named Leon.
 Kuroi is depicted as a cruel and ruthless businessman who will do anything, legal or not, to sell his idols and take down 765 Pro, including telling lies about 765 Pro to his idols. He tends to treat his idols as expendable pawns, using them solely for his personal gains. He is very picky too, choosing the most appealing and talented individuals available as his idols and employing questionable business strategies to promote them, rather than allowing them to build their abilities naturally, the complete opposite of Junjirō's methods.
 Kuroi and Junjirō were once old colleagues and friends, but later they had a falling out after Junjirō disagreed with how Kuroi raised his idols. Since that incident, Kuroi has vowed to destroy Junjirō's company and his idols by any means necessary.
 His company is in fact named after him, as "961" is pronounced ku-ro-i in Japanese.

Cinderella Girls
The Idolmaster Cinderella Girls was released in late 2011. Initially consisting of 84 idols, the game features a total of 190 idols as of November 2018, making it by far the largest The Idolmaster subseries, though only 94 of them are voiced as of September 2021.

346 Production
A large, well-established talent agency that serves as the main focus of The Idolmaster Cinderella Girls, especially its TV anime series. It is likely the largest talent agency in The Idolmaster series, having many talent divisions and a very large office.

Cinderella Project
 
 
 A lively young girl who is scouted by the Producer for the Cinderella Project, she was originally taking personal lessons at a training agency to become an idol, but after being scouted for the Cinderella Project, she took lessons at the 346 Production facilities. She is similar to Haruka judging from her personality, although her voice and looks are quite different. She is almost always cheerful and optimistic, and is happy to have finally become an idol. Although sometimes overly emotional, she generally acts as the friendly-type "good girl". Scouted early on, she doesn't get to do any work at first, due to not enough girls being in the project at the time. Once two more girls are recruited, she is grouped into a unit called "New Generations" with Rin and Mio, after the three performed as backup dancers onstage with Mika.
 Her Cinderella Master single, released on 8 August 2012, charted on the Oricon Singles Chart for eight weeks and topped at #12 on 20 August.
 
 
 A cool girl whose family runs a flower shop. She is similar to Chihaya in looks and demeanor. She originally was against the idea of being an idol, but the Producer managed to convince her to give it a try after meeting with her several times. Even after she becomes an idol, she maintains her cool and somewhat serious attitude, though she starts to enjoy singing and dancing on stage. Although cool and serious, she has a more feminine side that shows on occasion, usually when she is flustered or surprised by others. She is part of the unit "New Generations" with Uzuki and Mio.
 Her Cinderella Master single, released on 18 April 2012, charted on the Oricon Singles Chart for eight weeks and topped at #6 on 30 April.
 
 
 Mio is an energetic girl who tends to get ahead of herself when it comes to wanting to become a popular idol. She is the de facto leader of "New Generations" and seems somewhat similar to the Futami twins, Ami and Mami, both in her expression and playful attitude. She even has a habit of referring to people around her with nicknames, much like the Futami twins. Although she had auditioned for the Cinderella Project before, she came up short. She eventually managed to get through on her second try. She tends to be very good with singing and dancing, though she can get tired quite easily during lessons. During the first mini-concert for "New Generations" to promote their Debut CD, she became disappointed with the small crowd that turned up and almost quit being an idol altogether. After some time, the Producer and fellow idols convinced Mio to stay as an idol, and she has since been less focused on the size of crowds at concerts, instead focusing on the excitement of the crowd.
 Her Cinderella Master single, released on 23 January 2013, charted on the Oricon Singles Chart for four weeks and topped at #9 on 4 February.
 
 
 Kanako is a girl who enjoys doing idol work, but is also a little nervous at times. Her hobby is making sweets. She seems similar in demeanor to Azusa, having a tendency to be distraught when things do not go as planned. However, unlike Azusa, she tends to get flustered and nervous when things go wrong, rather than not really caring all that much. She enjoys wearing cute outfits like Chieri, and is also somewhat slow on the uptake for certain things. She still maintains a generally positive outlook on most things despite this. She is part of the unit called "Candy Island" with Chieri and Anzu.
 Her Cinderella Master single, released on 18 April 2012, charted on the Oricon Singles Chart for seven weeks and topped at #6 on 30 April.
 
 
 Chieri is a very shy girl with a demeanor and voice similar to Yukiho. She has a kind of stage fright, as she is incredibly nervous whenever on stage, although she seems to be able to control herself somewhat when she thinks of the audience as frogs. It seems she is even more nervous when her fellow idols are on stage too instead of her, as she was very anxious during the performance where "New Generations" was doing the backup dancing at Rika's concert. She carries a four-leaf clover around with her, although it's unknown if she keeps it for luck, or just happens to like clovers. She is in the unit "Candy Island" along with Anzu and Kanako.
 Her Cinderella Master single, released on 13 November 2013, charted on the Oricon Singles Chart for four weeks and topped at #15 on 25 November.
 
 
 Miku is a girl aiming to be a cute pop idol. She seems similar in demeanor to Iori, especially with her different attitudes on stage and off. She almost always wears cat ears and punctuates her sentences with the kitty sound "nya" (Japanese onomatopoeia for "meow"). She has an inexplicable affinity for cats, although she doesn't have one as a pet, and even hates fish. Although she really wants to act cute, she can get mad when she feels she isn't getting enough attention. She appears to have a large collection of different cat ears, but tends to always wear the same pair at work. According to her, she works hard like a cat, and is always ready for work. She carries cat ears everywhere she goes so she can be ready for work at any time. She often has a totally different attitude when not on camera or onstage. However, as soon as she knows the fans are watching, she puts on the cat ears and acts like a cute and innocent idol. She is one half of the unit "Asterisk" along with Riina.
 Her Cinderella Master single, released on 8 August 2012, charted on the Oricon Singles Chart for eight weeks and topped at #11 on 20 August.
 
 
 Anzu is a young reclusive girl who's so lazy she detests the idea of work itself. She tends to be similar to Miki, although much smaller in figure despite being older, with her lazy personality and tendency to fall asleep. She is usually seen sleeping at any possible time, especially during the early parts of the anime series. Her laziness is also highlighted when she and her fellow idols held a strike in protest of New Generations' debut, where Anzu demanded "8 days off every week". Although very lazy, she learns to work normally later on. She also seems to be a bit of a genius, as showcased when she was on a quiz show with her unit against a rival idol group, easily answering obscure questions and solving a complicated math problem incredibly fast in her head with almost no effort. Later on, she seems to have mostly done away with her laziness, but is still seen being somewhat lackadaisical about hard work. She is in the unit "Candy Island" along with Chieri and Kanako.
 Her Cinderella Master single, released on 18 April 2012, charted on the Oricon Singles Chart for ten weeks and topped at #4 on 30 April.
 
 
 Riina is a girl who loves rock music and aspires to be a rock idol. She is somewhat similar in demeanor to Makoto. Although almost the opposite of Miku, she and Miku were paired up as a unit, mainly because they were the only idols who hadn't debuted at the time. After some seriously heated arguments and fights, they learned to get along and perform together, although they still tended to be at odds with each other often. Riina plays guitar, but apparently only knows some simple chords and has headphones on most of the time, listening to rock music. Like Miku, who has a large collection of cat ears, she has a large collection of headphones, but is always seen with the same pair at work. She has a great admiration for a young boy who tries out her guitar and plays an amazing sequence of riffs on it, despite him being left-handed and her guitar being a right-handed one. She also has a tendency to say that something is "rocking", usually when she likes something, like her unit's name, which was originally just a placeholder placed by the Producer, since the unit didn't have a name on the sign-up sheet for the idol festival. She is one half of the unit "Asterisk" along with Miku.
 Her Cinderella Master single, released on 23 January 2013, charted on the Oricon Singles Chart for five weeks and topped at #7 on 4 February.
 
 
 Minami is a college student who plays lacrosse. She is similar to Ritsuko, being hardworking and responsible. She doesn't have a lot of character development, despite the fact that during the idol's training camp, she was elected as the Cinderella Project's supervisor due to being the oldest idol. However, she ended up overworking herself and fell sick during the idol fest, so she was initially unable to perform onstage. Later on, she managed to get over her sickness in time to perform with the rest of the idols during the finale. She is one half of the unit "Love Laika" along with Anastasia.
 Her Cinderella Master single, released on 22 May 2013, charted on the Oricon Singles Chart for five weeks and topped at #10 on 3 June.
 
 
 Ranko is a girl who dresses in goth-loli style and speaks with strange phrases like role-play. Disregarding her strange speech, she is very similar in looks and demeanor to Takane. Her unusual style of speech makes it hard for the Producer to understand her, so much so that he writes down her phrases in a notebook along with their "translation." She is the only idol in the Cinderella Project to have debuted by herself rather than being part of any unit. Although she dresses in a goth-loli style and talks like she is from "the abyss" (according to her), she actually hates scary movies and stories, and is very easily frightened by such things. Initially, the Producer had decided to promote her debut and song with a straight-up horror theme, but he was told that she didn't like horrific things, so he changed it to a Gothic theme. During the idol fest, since Minami was unable to perform with Anastasia, she went on with her and performed with her surprisingly well, despite never having practiced it (although she returned to solo work afterwards). Her stage name is "Rosenburg Engel".
 Her Cinderella Master single, released on 8 August 2012, charted on the Oricon Singles Chart for thirteen weeks and topped at #9 on 20 August.
 
 
 Nicknamed "Anya", she is a half-Russian girl. She seems quite similar to Takane, such as her native country not being Japan and her notice of certain small details that other tend to miss. Since she is Russian, she often speaks in Russian accidentally (which is subbed as gibberish), before remembering to switch back to Japanese, though she is not as fluent in Japanese. However, she has no problem in listening to any conversation in Japanese, seemingly able to understand it. She often asks Minami how to say certain things in Japanese or whether she said something correctly or not. She is very talented in singing initially, which lead to her being paired with Minami, who is apparently very hardworking. She is one half of the unit "Love Laika" along with Minami.
 Her Cinderella Master single, released on 13 November 2013, charted on the Oricon Singles Chart for six weeks and topped at #13 on 25 November.
 
 
 Miria is an innocent 11-year-old girl. She seems somewhat similar to Hibiki, being primarily energetic and cheerful. She is the youngest idol in the Cinderella Project and tends to hug and cling to older girls, especially Kirari. Although incredibly innocent, she can be a bit troublesome at times, hardly ever bothering to stop the other girls from harassing or pranking the Producer, and she even once helped Anzu flee from the other idols' sights so she could sleep all day. She is part of the unit "Dekoration" along with Kirari and Rika.
 Her Cinderella Master single, released on 22 May 2013, charted on the Oricon Singles Chart for five weeks and topped at #11 on 3 June.
 
 
 Rika is the 12-year-old younger sister of fellow 346 Production idol, Mika Jougasaki. She seems similar to Ai with her attitude on becoming well-known. Her sister wanted her to join her as part of the idol company so they could perform together in the future, but she stayed with the Cinderella Project to become a star without flaunting her sister's already-established popularity. Whenever she runs into her sister, she will exclaim "Onee-chan!" and hug her or cling to her obsessively. She is part of the unit "Dekoration" along with Kirari and Miria.
 Her Cinderella Master single, released on 18 April 2012, charted on the Oricon Singles Chart for seven weeks and topped at #9 on 30 April.
 
 
 Kirari is a tall 17-year-old girl. She clings to Anzu and keeps her in check like an older sister, but gets put into a different unit than her. She is somewhat similar to Yayoi, although much larger in figure and three years older, with her hyperactive personality. Similar to Azusa, she doesn't mind the small things and being an "older sister" type, and tends to be laid-back with her approach to work and events. Although the leader of her group, her partners tend to be able to do whatever they want, because she doesn't always effectively take charge or keep them in check like she does with Anzu. She is part of the unit "Dekoration" along with Rika and Miria.
 Her Cinderella Master single, released on 8 August 2012, charted on the Oricon Singles Chart for seven weeks and topped at #10 on 20 August.

346 staff
 
 
 The producer of the Cinderella Project who also works as a scout for 346 Production, he is the protagonist of The Idolmaster Cinderella Girls TV anime series. He has a large build and an intimidating face, but is overly polite and habitually says things rather bluntly. He often has trouble communicating with others as people tend to avoid him because of his imposing looks.
 
 
 The general manager of Cinderalla Project.
 
 
 The Producer's secretary.
 
 The four trainer sisters.
 
 
 The executive director of 346 Pro's idol division. She serves as the main antagonist to the Producer.

Cute idols
 
 
 An aspiring seiyū idol who claims to be an "eternally 17-years old" , a supposed planet she claims is "one hour away via train". In the anime version, she has a temp job at 346 Pro's cafe. She was fired from her weathercaster job.
 Her Cinderella Master single, released on 22 May 2013, charted on the Oricon Singles Chart for six weeks and topped at #7 on 3 June.
 
 
 A clumsy miko at her parents' shrine, she decided to become an idol, thinking idol activities could help free herself from the "God of Clumsiness". Because of her background, she integrates a Shinto motif into her attire. In episode 14 of the anime, she is summoned alongside Koume to remove Producer. In U149, she is a radio personality alongside Aiko in the unit .
 
 
 A gyaru from the Shōnan region who dropped out of high school for financial reasons. She holds a moped license and tones down her makeup during her idol activities. She appears in episodes 10 and 25 of the anime and is depicted in the "Wild Wind Girl" spinoff manga as being with Takumi.
 
 Please refer to the main cast section
 
 
 A former rival idol in the Sendai area who wears one eye patch at a time. She has a lone-wolf personality and was initially wary of Producer. She is a member of the idol unit  with Syoko and Nono. She has a non-speaking appearance in episode 25 of the anime.
 
 
 An anemic olfactophile who specializes in science experiments and chemistry and uses a perfume from her scientist father. Her interest in Producer came from the latter's smell. She and Frederica form the idol unit  in U149.
 Her Cinderella Master single, released on 18 November 2015, charted on the Oricon Singles Chart for 40 weeks and topped at #11 on 30 November.
 She was one of five idols who appeared in the November 2019 "Spin-off!" short.
 
 
 An idol with a helping personality who specializes in housework, whose parents' house are within the sightline of the Tottori Sand Dunes. She makes a voiceless cameo in episode 25 where she forms Pink Check School with Uzuki and Miho, and acts as an event MC in chapter 49 of U149.
 Her Cinderella Master single, released on 2 March 2016, charted on the Oricon Singles Chart for six weeks and topped at #9 on 14 March.
 
 
 A yamato nadeshiko fluent in  who is an only child from a traditionalist family nearby the Kamo River. Skilled in buyō, koto, and Ogura Hyakunin Isshu, she becomes an idol so she could get to learn about the outside world. She appears in "Muscle Castle" with Sachiko and Yuki in episode 9 of the anime and appears in a booth with Azuki, Kako, and Syuko.
 Her Cinderella Master single, released on 30 April 2014, charted on the Oricon Singles Chart for 13 weeks and topped at #11 on 12 May.
 
 
 A shy idol with a stammer. She likes stuffed animals is revealed to have a teddy bear called "Producer-kun" in Cinderella Theater.
 Her Cinderella Master single, released on 23 January 2013, charted on the Oricon Singles Chart for five weeks and topped at #6 on 4 February.
 
 
 A homework helper with a GPA of 4.0 who is a rival idol in her native Saitama Prefecture. She is a member of the idol unit  with Koume and Syoko, two idols with the same height as Sachiko. She appears in the anime as a contestant in Muscle Castle alongside Sae and Yuki and appears in episode 38 of U149.
 Her Cinderella Master single, released on 22 May 2013, charted on the Oricon Singles Chart for seven weeks and topped at #6 on 3 June.
 
 
 A third-year high school student with grade retention. She claims descent from vampires, takes walks under the moonlight, and has Chiyo as her housekeeper. She sees her idol career as an opportunity to emancipate Chiyo.
 She was one of five idols who appeared in the November 2019 "Spin-off!" short.
 
 Please refer to the main cast section
 
 Please refer to the main cast section
 
 
 A care-free college student fashionista who is a hāfu born to a French father. She moved from Paris to Japan aged five and has forgotten to speak French language. She often flirts with Producer. She appears as a member of Project:Krone in the anime and calls her smartphone camera  in the manga. She and Shiki form the idol unit  in U149.
 Her Cinderella Master single, released on 4 February 2015, charted on the Oricon Singles Chart for six weeks and topped at #11 on 16 February.
 
 
 A refined flutist who began learning the skill since childhood. She is shown to have a close relationship with Yuka Nakano to the point where Noriko calls it . In the anime, she eats crepes with the two and plays her trademark instrument at Ranko's performance.
 
 
 An energetic pervert who got into the business due to her interest in the female body, and schemes to grope other idols' breasts whenever she can. She is interested in female friends, even engaging in skinship with them. She received a voice actress for a  speaking appearance in episode 23 of Cinderella Girls Theater, eventually appearing in multiple songs.
 
 
 A karateka who gets into an idol career to broaden her interests. She holds a national championship and a position as team captain. She is exceptionally strong and also cares about her abs. She is seen eating crepes with Noriko and Yukari in episode 10 of the anime.
 Her Cinderella Master single, released on 2 March 2016, charted on the Oricon Singles Chart for eleven weeks and topped at #7 on 14 March.
 
 Please refer to the main cast section
 
 
A member of the track and field club, she is an athletic girl who drinks vegetable juice and takes daily runs.
 
 
 
 
 A former photography model with yandere tendencies towards the Producer. While cold and jealous towards her idol colleagues at times, she is usually kind to them. In the anime, she is a member of the idol unit Happy Princess and first appears in episode 3; in episode 14 she engages in stalking towards Producer to get his birthday; and in episode 25 she is one of four idols (the others being Kanako, Noriko, and Shizuku) who give away candy to fans.
 Her Cinderella Master single, released on 13 November 2013, charted on the Oricon Singles Chart for six weeks and topped at #11 on 25 November.
 
 
 She is a member of Totokira Gakuen in the anime.
 Her Cinderella Master single, released on 18 November 2015, charted on the Oricon Singles Chart for eleven weeks and topped at #12 on 30 November.
 
 
 An idol with excellent skills in creating handmade accessories. During her debut, she was reluctant to engage in idol activities, but gradually gained confidence.
 
 
 
 Please refer to the main cast section

Cool idols
 
 Please refer to the main cast section
 
 
She originally had doubts of being an idol prior to the special training. She makes a non-speaking appearance in the anime as a member of Blue Napoleon.
 
 
 An aspiring and easygoing girl hailing from a fishing community in Aomori Prefecture. Because of this, she has a large liking of fish, and is often seen carrying a stuffed fish with her.
 
 
 
 
 Her Cinderella Master single, released on 4 February 2015, charted on the Oricon Singles Chart for 44 weeks and topped at #6 on 16 February.
 
 
 The younger twin sister of Nagi.
 
 
 A frail girl who dresses herself as a gyaru to help cope with the depression resulting from a strange childhood sickness that she keeps secret from most people. In the anime, she has known Rin and Nao since middle school, and they eventually reunited at 346 Production. The three later formed an idol unit named "Triad Primus".
 Her Cinderella Master single, released on 30 April 2014, charted on the Oricon Singles Chart for seven weeks and topped at #5 on 12 May.
 
 
 
 
 A high school freshman who loves watching anime, but suddenly decided to become an idol so she can wear girly clothes. In the anime, she has known Rin and Karen since middle school, and they eventually reunited at 346 Production. The three later formed an idol unit named "Triad Primus".
 Her Cinderella Master single, released on 30 April 2014, charted on the Oricon Singles Chart for 20 weeks and topped at #7 on 12 May.
 She was one of five idols who appeared in the November 2019 "Spin-off!" short.
 
 Please refer to the main cast section
 
 
 Her Cinderella Master single, released on 23 January 2013, charted on the Oricon Singles Chart for five weeks and topped at #8 on 4 February.
 
 
 
 
 
 
 
 
 
 
 
 
 Her Cinderella Master single, released on 2 March 2016, charted on the Oricon Singles Chart for 39 weeks and topped at #7 on 14 March.
 
 Please refer to the main cast section
 
 
 Her Cinderella Master single, released on 4 February 2015, charted on the Oricon Singles Chart for five weeks and topped at #4 on 16 February.
 
 
 
 
 
 Please refer to the main cast section
 
 
 An idol who worked as a waitress after being kicked out of her parents' wagashiya. She is a blood donor. In the anime, she is a member of "Project:Krone" and appears in the episode 25 booth with Azusa, Kako and Sae.
 Her Cinderella Master single, released on 18 November 2015, charted on the Oricon Singles Chart for 19 weeks and topped at #13 on 30 November.
 
 
 
 
 Her Cinderella Master single, released on 13 November 2013, charted on the Oricon Singles Chart for six weeks and topped at #12 on 25 November.
 
 
 Her Cinderella Master single, released on 18 November 2015, charted on the Oricon Singles Chart for 15 weeks and topped at #8 on 30 November.
 
 Please refer to the main cast section
 
 
 
 
 An elegant veteran idol with a taste for wordplays and alcoholic drinks. In the anime, she is depicted as a veteran idol for 346 Production.
 Her Cinderella Master single, released on 18 April 2012, charted on the Oricon Singles Chart for fourteen weeks and topped at #7 on 30 April.
 
 
 
 
 A mysterious skilled hacker who collects secret data about 346 Production idols. It is unknown who she works for or why she became an idol in the first place, though her introduction suggests that she doesn't like the idea of being an idol.

Passion idols
 
 
 Her Cinderella Master single, released on 2 March 2016, charted on the Oricon Singles Chart for nine weeks and topped at #10 on 14 March.
 
 Please refer to the main cast section
 
 
 
 
 Her Cinderella Master single, released on 4 February 2015, charted on the Oricon Singles Chart for five weeks and topped at #6 on 16 February.
 
 
 Her Cinderella Master single, released on 22 May 2013, charted on the Oricon Singles Chart for five weeks and topped at #12 on 3 June.
 
 
 The older twin sister of Hayate. 
 
 Please refer to the main cast section
 
 
 Her Cinderella Master single, released on 30 April 2014, charted on the Oricon Singles Chart for four weeks and topped at #12 on 12 May.
 
 
 Her Cinderella Master single, released on 30 April 2014, charted on the Oricon Singles Chart for five weeks and topped at #8 on 12 May.
 
 
 Her Cinderella Master single, released on 4 February 2015, charted on the Oricon Singles Chart for five weeks and topped at #7 on 16 February.
 
 
 Rika's older sister. In the anime, she is a member of the idol unit Happy Princess.
 Her Cinderella Master single, released on 8 August 2012, charted on the Oricon Singles Chart for nine weeks and topped at #13 on 20 August.
 
 Please refer to the main cast section
 
 
 Her Cinderella Master single, released on 18 November 2015, charted on the Oricon Singles Chart for 11 weeks and topped at #14 on 30 November.
 
 
 
 
 A delusional idol who does a lot of daydreaming and has her head in the clouds. She wants to be a real-life Cinderella and thinks that the Prince Charming will arrive.
 
 
 
 
 
 
 A confident daddy's girl who came into the idol business to please him. She has a taste for leopard and tiger prints.
 She was one of five idols who appeared in the November 2019 "Spin-off!" short.
 
 Please refer to the main cast section
 
 
 
 
 
 
 
 
 
 
 
 
 Her Cinderella Master single, released on 2 March 2016, charted on the Oricon Singles Chart for 35 weeks and topped at #8 on 14 March.
 
 
 A sixteen-year-old idol raised on a dairy farm in Iwate, Shizuku loves cows and some of her stage costumes are inspired on them. She is also known for having the largest bust size of all idols in the entire Idolmaster franchise.
 
 
 A nine-year-old idol who previously appeared in children's television series. She calls Producer sensei and is an excellent chef who teaches another idol how to bake cookies. She is a member of Totokira Gakuen beginning in episode 17 of the anime.
 
 
 She was one of five idols who appeared in the November 2019 "Spin-off!" short.
 
 
 Her Cinderella Master single, released on 13 November 2013, charted on the Oricon Singles Chart for six weeks and topped at #13 on 25 November. 
 
 
 Her Cinderella Master single, released on 23 January 2013, charted on the Oricon Singles Chart for five weeks and topped at #5 on 4 February.

315 Production
The talent agency where the main cast of The Idolmaster SideM works. There are 49 idols in 315 Pro as of Growing Stars, and they are all male idols, as opposed to other talent agencies in the game series which have only female ones. The idols here are grouped into sixteen units and categorized into three archetypes: Physical, Intelligent, and Mental.

All 315 Pro idols appear in the SideM games and in the SideM Mini anime.

315 STARS
315 STARS is a collective unit consisting of the 19 members of the six units focused on in the SideM anime: Jupiter, DRAMATIC STARS, Beit, S.E.M, High×Joker, and W.

DRAMATIC STARS
The main unit of the SideM subseries, DRAMATIC STARS takes its name from the three unit members' vastly different backgrounds and the dramatic backstories that they each experience.
 
 
 Attribute type: Physical
 A 28-year-old former lawyer, Teru is athletic, cheerful and kind, and has a strong sense of justice, having dreamed of becoming a superhero. After being fired from his job as a lawyer, he got called about becoming an idol, met both Kaoru and Tsubasa via the Producer at a bar while being drunk and went to the auditions. He loves tokusatsu special effects, being a fan of the genre, and enjoys playing darts.
 
 
 Attribute type: Intelligent
 A 26-year-old former doctor, Kaoru is known to be a perfectionist. He acts condescending and rude towards the other 315 idols, including Teru, and refuses to speak to dumb people. He aspired to become a doctor out of his tragic past – his older sister, whom he loved for her brilliant singing, died from an incurable disease. Heartbroken over her death, Kaoru wears his sister's dolphin pendant, and reads her poetry book which he keeps as a memento. He is skilled in magic tricks and ventriloquism.
 
 
 Attribute type: Mental
 A 24-year-old former pilot, Tsubasa lost his job as a result of messing up with his first flight. He went to a concert of Jupiter with the Producer, who asked whether he wanted to become an idol too. However, when he took on a new career as an idol, he feared ruining it as he did with his previous pilot career, but after a talk with Teru, he realizes that he must continue going after what he wants. He is aware of his large build and can eat an entire meal in 5 minutes. He has spoken in an interview about taking another job as a gourmet reporter in the future, and hints on co-hosting a cooking show with Teru. He has two younger siblings, is quiet, and hates wasabi.

Jupiter
An all-male idol group introduced in The Idolmaster 2. Originally produced by 961 Production, Jupiter was created by Kuroi as an idol unit to counter 765 Pro's rise in popularity. In the anime, they are an established and popular idol unit. As of Episode 21 of the anime, they left 961 Pro to start on their own after knowing of Kuroi's dirty tactics. As of The Idolmaster SideM, Jupiter has joined 315 Production.
 
 
 Attribute type: Physical
 Tōma is one of the idols introduced in The Idolmaster 2. The de facto leader of Jupiter, he is a year younger than Takane. Described as a hot-blooded young man, he is very competitive and takes his job as an idol seriously, but also wishes to compete against anyone fair and square. While he easily gets pissed off when teased, he is surprisingly polite when speaking. Tōma enjoys playing soccer and collecting figures from his favorite mecha anime, and is in fact skilled at cooking.
 The Idolmaster 2 hints at a potential relationship between him and Haruka.
 In The Idolmaster anime, Tōma is shown to be at odds with Kuroi, despite working for 961 Pro. He frequently calls Kuroi out for the latter's business practices, which he deems unethical. This, in turn, becomes the reason why Tōma somehow feels bad for Chihaya upon finding out the defamatory magazine article about her past.
 
 
 Attribute type: Intelligent
 Hokuto is one of the idols introduced in The Idolmaster 2. He is a year younger than Azusa, making him the oldest member of Jupiter. A well-known ladies' man, he is gifted with a charming appeal and likes to flirt with young girls. As the oldest member of Jupiter, Hokuto also handles public relations for the group. According to his backstory in SideM, Hokuto was originally a piano prodigy and aimed to become a pianist, but an injury caused him to be unable to play piano again.
 The Idolmaster 2 hints at a potential relationship between him and Makoto.
 
 
 Attribute type: Mental
 Shōta is one of the idols introduced in The Idolmaster 2. He is the youngest member of Jupiter, a year younger than Iori. In contrast to fellow members of Jupiter, he is a laid-back boy who would rather take things easy. Despite this, and his innocent looks, Shōta is actually quite energetic and really loves to pull pranks on anyone, especially Tōma. His only known hobbies are napping and filial piety.
 The Idolmaster 2 hints at a potential relationship between him and Yayoi.

Beit
An idol unit with a prince theme. As their unit name suggests, each member of this unit was originally a part-timer.
 
 
 Attribute type: Mental
 Pierre is an innocent and optimistic European prince, probably from Belgium or Luxembourg. He currently lives in Japan and works as a mascot at an amusement park, handing out balloons in a frog suit. He was scouted by the Producer during his regular shift to become an idol. His love for making people smile led to a decision to accept that offer, and soon he formed a unit with Kyōji and Minori. Concepts such as autographs, kidnapping, and Japanese customs in general have to be explained to him, and his Japanese is terrible. Pierre came to Japan as a result of a throne dispute between his two older brothers when their father fell ill, making it unsafe for him to stay in his fatherland anymore. He is often seen in his frog mascot suit, and is surprisingly good at peeling mandarin oranges. His full name is revealed to be .
 
 
 Attribute type: Physical
 A former flower shop clerk, Minori has admired idols, notably Jupiter, for as long as he can remember, to the point where he collects all DVDs of live idol performances. Despite his calm and friendly nature, he was once a delinquent, as evidenced by his past as a gang member, which explains why he is prone to threatening or scolding someone, although in a refined manner. He compares other people to flowers when talking about them. He is also skilled at sewing and cooking. Since he is often seen doting on Pierre so much, he is considered the leader of his own unit. As an aficionado of idols, Minori understands what other fans want and, because of this, he habitually takes pictures with Kyōji and Pierre on his smartphone and emphasizes the importance of his unit's costumes. Before performing, he looks at flower stands sent to the agency by fans and praises his fellow teammates whenever they do a successful job; he is also protective of them. As shown in an in-game event, he enjoys barbecuing and riding motorcycles.
 
 
 Attribute type: Intelligent
 A former convenience store clerk, Kyōji became an idol to start from scratch at Pierre's advice after moving out of his family's house following arguments with his father and older brother over his college entrance exam grades. He is not good with speaking in a manner that is not harsher than intended to be, and has admitted to holding a grudge against rich people. Despite this, he has good intentions and loves his fellow teammates. He is also not good at smiling or television appearances, and manages to achieve a more natural smile by thinking about his fans' support when made to improve his stage presence and fanservice ability on one occasion. However, he has a poor relationship with his family, except his younger brother. Kyōji can perform mathematical calculations in his mind and do housework himself, especially laundry.

S.E.M.
An idol unit consisting of three former high school teachers. The name of their unit stands for Science, English, and Mathematics.
 
 
 Attribute type: Intelligent
 Michio is a former math teacher with a serious and analytical personality. He became a idol with the purpose of not being trumped by a quirky costume; though over time, he has come to accept his idol duties fully and with great zeal from his costumes to acting roles and other assigned work. He incorporates mathematical references in his dialogue and can tackle any problem from a logical viewpoint, often organizing his ideas on white boards and drawing up graphs and other mathematical representations to aid him in coming to a solution or in presenting his ideas.
 
 
 Attribute type: Mental
 Rui is an upbeat and fun-loving former English teacher who never lets things put him down. Because of this background, he has a habit of slipping English words in his speech. Believing that he could become a world star with his fluency in English, he has always wanted to become an idol, thinking it would be much more exciting to be one. In fact, his motivation kicked off when he happened to see his best friend since university, Hokuto Ijūin, perform at his school's cultural festival. Fittingly for his personality, Rui is very much into extreme sports, namely skiing, snowboarding, and surfing.
 
 
 Attribute type: Intelligent
 A miserly former chemistry teacher, Jirō is very lax about his job and quite a slacker, in contrast to his colleague, Michio Kazama. Whenever no one was looking, he would use the school's lab equipments to brew himself coffee, only to be reprimanded by Michio for that. He decided to become an idol because he had heard of Michio talking to himself about becoming an idol. While at first skeptical of the idea, in part because he will miss his old days as a teacher, Jirō ended up joining Michio and Rui to become idols once he learned of how much money they could make.

High×Joker
An idol unit formed out of a high school light music club. In the anime, they were scouted by the Producer after watching one of their performances.
 
 
 Attribute type: Physical
 The lead vocalist of the unit, Shiki is a high school boy who loves his friends at the light music club. He is not the best student at school, as he gets poor test scores. In fact, there is nothing he's good at other than singing. Unwilling to see his friends go their separate ways after graduating, Shiki came up with the idea of having the five debut as an idol unit, so as to be able to stay together.
 
 
 Attribute type: Physical
 The guitarist of the unit, Hayato is an energetic and friendly young boy who's desperate to break himself free from his 'average guy' image. He was the one who founded the light music club, and he remains its leader. As a result, Hayato has a strong sense of responsibility for his club members. He is always ready to help out his club members whenever they're having trouble.
 
 
 Attribute type: Mental
 The drummer of the unit, Haruna is a hard-working boy who never stops doing anything he can to make a living for himself and his mother. Because of this, he has been held in school twice, and in order to improve his academic performance, he decided to join the light music club. His poor grades aside, Haruna is fluent in English and is really good at hairdoing and make-up. His favorite food is donuts.
 
 
 Attribute type: Intelligent
 The keyboardist of the unit, Jun is a studious and no-nonsense young boy with a great passion for music. Despite being a piano prodigy, he plays keyboard to better fit the light music club's pop/rock image, though he insists that the piano and the keyboard are not the same thing. Considered an honor student at his school, he is more focused on upcoming exams than the other members of the club, and has to be the one to look after them, especially Shiki and Haruna, just to study together. Before joining the light music club, Jun was quite hesitant to try something new, including being an idol. But he felt that he had no choice but to do it so he could help out his childhood friend, Natsumi Sakaki.
 
 
 Attribute type: Intelligent
 The bassist of the unit, Natsumi has been friends with Jun Fuyumi since childhood. In fact, he has been emotionally attached to Jun, thinking of him as his only friend. Natsumi is incredibly shy and rarely speaks, often relying on Jun to help him meet strangers more properly. He doesn't even care that he is popular for his good looks, preferring to be a supporter of his friends. He joined the light music club only because Jun showed an interest in doing so.

W
An idol unit composed of twins, similar to the Futami twins. They were originally professional footballers. Because of this, they have soccer motif in their attire, and they refer to the Producer as if he is their coach.
 
 
 Attribute type: Intelligent
 The responsible younger twin, Kyōsuke is a hardworking and reliable young man who takes whatever he does seriously, sometimes to the point of worry and doubt. He is also the one who looks after his brother, even blaming himself for his brother's career-ending injury. Kyōsuke was at first hesitant about his new life as an idol, but as time passes, he learns to put a trust in others and befriend them.
 
 
 Attribute type: Mental
 The energetic older twin, Yūsuke is a carefree and playful young man who's bad at learning anything, even forgetting the details, but remains optimistic all the time. He sustained a serious knee injury during a match, forcing him to retire early. While recovering in the hospital, Yūsuke started taking an interest in becoming an idol, and asked Kyōsuke to become one too, so they could continue playing as the ultimate team together.

Altessimo
An idol unit themed around classical music.
 
 
 Attribute type: Intelligent
 
 
 Attribute type: Mental

FRAME
An idol unit with an emergency service theme.
 
 
 Attribute type: Intelligent
 Hideo is a former policeman unfortunately born with a frightening facial appearance and sharp teeth. Because of this, he is often mistaken for a thug instead of a police officer, but at heart, he is overall a very good man. In order to clear up all misunderstanding about him, Hideo decided to turn to the life of an idol. During his time as a policeman, Hideo also worked as a dog trainer for the force. He also owns a pet dog said to be as scary as himself, and his favorite food is hotcakes, especially ones topped with syrup.
 
 
 Attribute type: Physical
 Despite being clumsy and always having a streak of misfortunes throughout his life, Ryū is an optimistic young man who always tries to look on the bright side no matter what trouble he gets into. He once wanted to be the best fireman in town, but soon realized the job was not the best career choice for him. Ryū lost his job after he was accused of committing an intentional assault – he accidentally tripped and knocked over a stranger at a crowd of spectators during an idol concert. However, he saw his luck turn around upon learning from the idol who was performing at the concert that the man he knocked over was in fact her stalker. This, in turn, convinced Ryū to become an idol himself.
 
 
 Attribute type: Mental
 One of the largest characters among the cast of SideM, Shingen serves as the father figure to fellow members of the unit, and is very protective of them. Despite this, he is somewhat nervous around women, though he does care for his young niece Amane, treating her as if she is his daughter. Before becoming an idol, he was originally a Japan Self-Defense Force trooper. One of the few known things about his past is that he lost a close friend of his while on duty. In honor of his fallen friend, he dons the friend's dogtags whenever he is in casual attire. Eager to put the tragedy beleaguering his time as a soldier behind him, Shingen resigned from the force and took a more lighthearted job, so as to make his niece happy.

Sai

 
 
 Attribute type: Intelligent
 
 
 Attribute type: Mental
 
 
 Attribute type: Mental

Shinsoku Ikkon
An idol unit composed of two former high school delinquents.
 
 
 Attribute type: Physical
 
 
 Attribute type: Intelligent

Café Parade
An idol unit consisting of the staff members of the café of the same name. In order to save their café from going out of business, they auditioned to become idols.
 
 
 Attribute etype: Mental
 Yukihiro is the owner of Café Parade who's very kind to his employees and customers. Living by the motto "one good deed a day", he always does as hard as he can to make people happy. But more often than not, Yukihiro is absent-minded and tends to get lost whenever he is travelling, having to rely on fellow unit members to get him straight. He is also easily frightened by scary things. According to his backstory, Yukihiro had a troubled childhood, where he hardly ever got to see his workaholic parents, leading him to run away from home upon graduating from high school so he could travel around the world himself. One particular incident during his travel convinced him to open Café Parade once he returned to Japan. When the café found itself struggling to stay afloat, Yukihiro invited his employees to become idols, believing they could bring happiness together that way.
 
 
 Attribute type: Intelligent
 The straight man of the unit, Sōichirō is the pastry chef of Café Parade. He speaks politely and is thankful toward customers, though people tend to find him terrifying when he is angry. It is unknown why his eyes are always shut, but Sōichirō was born to a family of wagashi makers, and lost his right to inherit his family's wagashiya due to his inability to look at, much less eat anko. Sōichirō is best friends with Yukihiro Kamiya since middle school, but can't stand his airheadedness and terrible sense of direction. Even then, Sōichirō is glad that he was able to reunite with Yukihiro as the two went on to open Café Parade.
 
 
 Attribute type: Physical
 Asselin describes himself as the manservant of the Demon Lord Satan, coming to the mortal world as an alchemist to learn the ways of the mortals. In reality, he is the 26-year-old head chef of Café Parade with an absurd sense of imagination. Before he started working at Café Parade, Asselin was an award-winning chef who was struggling to find and keep a job at various restaurants because of his 'demonic' eccentricity. Asselin is always seen carrying a stuffed toy, which he names Satan, on his shoulder. In fact, he has been imagining himself as a demon to make up for his shyness and social ineptitude.
 
 
 Attribute type: Physical
 A lover of all cute stuff, Saki works at Café Parade as a waiter, dressed in a maid dress. He is actually a boy, but seems to enjoy getting dressed in girl's clothes. In fact, he was inspired by a particular 876 Pro idol who was indeed a crossdressing idol back then. Saki believes that he could discover his true self by crossdressing. However, Saki has to keep his job as a waiter and an idol a secret from his classmates and family, as all of this could put him in trouble, especially with his strict father. He is best friends with Makio Uzuki, whom he affectionately addresses as "Roll".
 
 
 Attribute type: Mental
 Makio is a waiter at Café Parade with a sweet tooth. He has a great love for cakes, mainly because when he was young, his mother would make some cakes for him. In fact, he applied for a job at Café Parade mainly for the desire to get the taste of their cakes. Ever since then though, Makio takes his job seriously and becomes determined to keep the café running. When Yukihiro came up with the idea of auditioning together to become idols for 315 Pro, Makio eagerly accepted.

Mofumofuen

 
 
 Attribute type: Mental
 
 
 Attribute type: Intelligent
 
 
 Attribute type: Physical

The Kogadō

 
 
 Attribute type: Physical
 
 
 Attribute type: Physical
 
 
 Attribute type: Physical

F-LAGS
An idol unit added to the game on April 28, 2015. Unlike other units, this unit has no particular theme, though one of its members is a returning character.
 
 
 Attribute type: Mental
 Returning from Dearly Stars, Ryō has moved from 876 Pro to 315 Pro and is now working as a proper male idol, making his good ending in Dearly Stars the official canon. Even then, his background as a crossdressing idol is still referenced, clearly as an homage to his story in Dearly Stars, and he even retains the same voice actress from all his prior appearances.
 
 
 Attribute type: Physical
 Daigo is a son of a yakuza gangster, the 6th generation of his family to be exact. One day, he bumped into what looked like a 'girl', and decided to take in interest in her. The next day however, he learned from his classmates that the 'girl' he had met before turned out to be a boy named Ryō Akizuki, who revealed the truth about himself to the public. Shortly afterwards, he decided to become an idol too, thinking it would be interesting to be one. In contrast to his background, Daigo is an upbeat boy who desires to make people happy with his performances. He speaks with a Hiroshima dialect and enjoys playing fighting games.
 
 (2014-2019), Shunya Hiruma(2020-present)
 Attribute type: Intelligent
 Kazuki is a quiet and calm novelist whose father is also a novelist. Probably because he comes from a rural place far away from cities, he has social anxiety and prefers to be alone, and he easily gets motion sickness when traveling in a car. One day, Kazuki caught wind of Ryō Akizuki's public announcement on TV. Upon finding out that Ryō had started performing as a male idol, he decided to turn to the life of an idol. Kazuki is a proficient reader who can memorize a whole book he has read, and he is also shown to be able to identify edible mushrooms.

Legenders
An idol unit themed around historical figures. Added to the game on July 22, 2016, the three members of this unit were chosen from the nine characters that made up the New Idol Discovery Project based on vote counts.
 
 
 Attribute type: Mental
 
 
 Attribute type: Intelligent
 
 
 Attribute type: Intelligent

C.FIRST
An idol unit introduced in Growing Stars, consisting of student council presidents of three different high schools in Tokyo.
 
 
 Attribute type: Intelligent
 
 
 Attribute type: Mental
 
 
 Attribute type: Physical

315 staff
 
 
 The silhouetted CEO of 315 Pro.
 
 
 The clerk of 315 Pro.
  (315 Pro)
 
 The producer of 315 Pro.
 In the games, the producer is depicted as an androgynous person, leaving his gender ambiguous. In the anime however, the producer is clearly depicted as a male, and is the one in charge of the 315 STARS group.

283 Production
The talent agency where the main cast of The Idolmaster Shiny Colors works. There are a total of 25 idols in 283 Pro as of the 3rd anniversary update, grouped into seven units. Each of these units comes with a unique gameplay trait, for example illumination STARS uses two stats for their appeal strength instead of just one.

illumination STARS
 is one of the four idol units introduced at the launch of The Idolmaster Shiny Colors. They are considered the representative of the Shiny Colors subseries. Their image color is yellow.
 
 
 Mano is a shy, soft-spoken girl who's kind to people around her. She was scouted by the Producer while she was singing in a park and, upon learning of who she is, Mano gleefully accepted the offer to become an idol for 283 Pro, wishing to overcome her shyness. Mano loves pigeons and her singing is said to often attracts pigeons. In fact, she even owns a pet pigeon named Pii-chan.
 
 
 A stoic, socially awkward high school freshman, Hiori takes everything she does seriously, to the point of doubting herself and comparing herself to others. She is harsh toward others, though in reality she is just socially awkward and wishes to be friends with anyone. Her harsh attitude aside, Hiori is a very kind girl who cares for every friend she makes.
 
 
 Born in the United States to a Japanese father and an American mother, Meguru came to Japan when she was in her 3rd year of elementary school. Meguru is an energetic and outgoing girl who often does sports and is very popular at her high school. She never doubts her own capacities and proves reliable when it comes to helping overcome others' worries. Since she has been used to hanging out with people she knows, Meguru hates being alone and feels lonely easily.

L'Antica
 is one of the four idol units introduced at the launch of The Idolmaster Shiny Colors. They are best distinguished by their Gothic dress style featuring perdominantly dark colors. Their image color is purple.
 
 
 
 
 
 
 
 , Shio Kisui (2022–present)

Hōkago Climax Girls
 is one of the four idol units introduced at the launch of The Idolmaster Shiny Colors. As their unit name suggests, they take on the Super Sentai theme as their idol image. Their image color is orange.

ALSTROEMERIA
 is one of the four idol units introduced at the launch of The Idolmaster Shiny Colors. Named after the flower of the same name, they are described as a "pop and happy" type of idol unit. Their image color is pink.

Straylight
 was introduced in the 1st Anniversary of Shiny Colors. Their image color is red.

noctchill
 was introduced in the 2nd Anniversary of Shiny Colors. They are composed of four childhood friends. Their image color is light blue.

SHHis
 was introduced in the 3rd Anniversary of Shiny Colors. Their image color is green.

283 Production staff
 
 
 The president of 283 Production.
 
 
 The clerk at 283 Production who also holds several part-time jobs. She is also Nichika's older sister.

Other characters

The Idolmaster Dearly Stars
 
 
 Mai Hidaka is the mother of Ai Hidaka. She is 29 years old, which means that she was indeed very young when she became a mother. Because of her youth, Mai is rather sporadic and very energetic, though never to the point Ai can get. She was once a legendary S-Rank super idol who won the Ultimate Idol, but she was only active for three years before abruptly retiring. Her image song "ALIVE" was extremely popular, and she even later allowed her daughter to adopt as her own when she became an idol. Later in Ai's story, she suddenly comes out of retirement with Manami Okamoto as her manager. Her sole reason for coming out of retirement at all is because she thought it would be fun and interesting to stand on stage again with her daughter.
 
 
 Ayane Suzuki, who prefers to be called , is a fairly high ranking net idol, as well as Eri Mizutani's chat buddy. When Eri was still a net idol, Ayane was supportive of Eri, wishing the best of her ability whenever she could. As someone who looked up to Eri back in her net idol days, Ayane believes that Reiko Ozaki had tricked the pure Eri into joining the "Dark Side" and tries to make Eri reconsider her choice.
 In The Idolmaster 2, Cineria is the name of a news reporter. This seems to allude to the ending of The Idolmaster Innocent Blue volume 3. A unit with this name also appears on the "DO-TOP TV" ranking.
 
 
 Reiko Ozaki is a freelance producer who discovered the talents of Eri Mizutani upon watching one of her videos. Ozaki started scouting Eri and emailed her everyday, offering her a job as a live idol and asking her to meet her in person. Ozaki temporarily makes a contract with 876 Production and debuts Eri under the company label. Ozaki herself was once an idol, part of an idol duo known as riola, paired with another girl, Satomi Kondou. During her idol career, Ozaki never got past F-Rank due to slanderous comments about the unit and their agency's president that were posted online. This caused her to hate the internet and drives her desire to protect Eri from it. The song "Precog" was going to be her last image song, but went unfinished by the end of her career. She later allowed Eri to finish the song and use it as her own.
 
 
 Sōichi Takeda is a talented music producer who also writes songs on the side, depending on his mood. While he plays a minor role in the series, he has the biggest role in Ryō's story. Takeda has a strong passion for instrumental jazz and classical music, and actually owns a radio station called "Old Whistle" to honor classical music. However, he also has a dream of creating an idol that could help ascend music. In fact, before he took interest in Ryō, Takeda only allowed one other idol, Chihaya Kisaragi, whose talents he was quick to recognize, to appear on "Old Whistle". Chihaya had personally approached Takeda several times to have him write a song for her, only to be turned down as he felt that talent like hers would be wasted on a song written on a whim. Takeda was also the one who wrote the song "Dazzling World", which eventually became Ryō's image song. As he collaborates with Ryō, Takeda is able to learn and challenge himself to the point where Ryō can finally stand and the two can achieve their respective dreams.
 
 
 Yumeko Sakurai is a freelance idol who's determined to achieve her dream no matter what it takes. Introduced as rival to Ryō Akizuki, she is thought to be an extremely talented idol, though it is revealed that she has cheated her way to the top by sabotaging rival idols by various means, including giving them a candy that clogs the vocal chords or making the stage floor slippery. After Ryō convinces her to stop, Yumeko reveals that her dream was to appear as a guest on Takeda's show "Old Whistle". Despite being rivals, she frequently hangs out with Ryō to talk about their upcoming auditions. After Ryō reveals himself as a boy, Yumeko starts to have a crush on him, much to her discomfort. Yumeko also has an extremely high admiration for Azusa Miura, so much so that she refers to her as an older sister.

The Idolmaster Starlit Season
 
 
 Kohaku Okuzora is an idol scouted by 765 Production's Producer for Project Luminous. Her birthday is the same as the release date of The Idolmaster arcade game.
 In the game, when she met the 765 Pro producer for the first time, Kohaku revealed that she first heard of 765 Pro from her mother, a famous actress named . It is also revealed that she was once an idol for 961 Production, having previously been a member of the idol unit AlbaNoct, paired with Aya.

The Idolmaster Shiny Colors
 
 
 Luca Ikaruga is a mysterious solo idol introduced in the 3rd Anniversary of Shiny Colors as a rival. For unknown reasons, likely something personal, Luca has a low opinion of 283 Production, suggesting her hatred of 283 Pro idols. It is revealed that she was paired with Mikoto Aketa to form an unknown idol unit in the past.

Legacy
Bandai Namco Entertainment (and to an extent, Aniplex) has allowed third-party companies and organizations to use the franchise's characters in their promotions both individually or as a group. Miki Hoshii was named the store manager of Tower Records' Japanese branches on March 21, 2011, at the retailer's Shinjuku branch. In 2012, the Tokyo Shrine Agency distributed posters and pamphlets featuring the 765 Production idols as part of a campaign to attract hatsumōde visitors. Sagan Tosu featured the idol characters of Cinderella Girls on the tickets and merchandises for their September 12, 2015 match against the Shimizu S-Pulse and September 26, 2015, match against the Ventforet Kofu. In November 2016, Mimura Kanako was appointed as the campaign girl for Boul'mich, a French chocolate shop in Japan.

On September 6, 2018, Nissin Foods teamed up with Bandai Namco for a music video featuring Honda Mio, Hino Akane and Takamori Aiko as the unit Positive Passion advertising their Curry Meshi product titled "Spice Paradise", produced by Sanzigen. A CD including eight versions of "Spice Paradise" was released in a special box also including 6 Curry Meshi cups and a clear file on September 18. The music video features Curry Meshi's mascot, Curry Meshi-kun. Five months earlier, SideM also had its own collaboration with Nissin Foods, albeit with their Cup Meshi instant rice product. The SideM/Cup Meshi collaboration featured Michio Hazama, Rui Maita, and Jirō Yamashita, all three of which form the S.E.M unit in SideM.

2019 Cinderella Girls general election
In late April 2019, non-Japanese fans of the Cinderella Girls sub-series of the Idolmaster franchise started pairing the then-unvoiced Brazilian character Natalia with Solid Snake of Konami's Metal Gear franchise. On 22 April 2019, Canadian YouTuber Mahado, a fan of the series, released a video in which Solid Snake, voiced by David Hayter, urges players to vote for Natalia in the 2019 Cinderella Girls general election, with audio by PepsiJohnny and Japanese subtitles by ThePascalPama. The campaign involved both players in and outside Japan, and at the end of September 2019, Natalia placed 9th in the overall preliminary rankings (3rd in Passion idol rankings) in the election and finally got a voice actress in the form of Teru Ikuta.

References

Lists of anime and manga characters
Lists of Namco characters